Astathes velata is a species of beetle in the family Cerambycidae. It was described by Thomson in 1865. It is known from Java.

References

V
Beetles described in 1865